New York Street Games is a 2010 documentary film directed by Matt Levy about children's games played by kids in New York City for centuries. The games are fondly remembered by people who grew up in the city. Current and historical documentary footage shows children playing these games, interspersed with scenes of celebrities discussing their own childhood experiences playing these games on the streets of New York. The story is brought to the present with discussions of the current role of street games and opinions as to what kids lose by not having the freedom to play without adult supervision, most importantly the social skills developed when kids could play in the streets.

Synopsis  
New York Street Games lovingly recalls a central feature of the lives of hundreds of thousands of children who grew up in New York City in the twentieth century: games played in the streets of the city. Many of the ball games featured are played with a pink rubber ball called a Spaldeen. In the documentary,  Whoopi Goldberg is seen discussing her childhood, and handling a Spaldeen. At some point, she puts the ball to her nose and smells it; you can tell by the look on her face that she is transported by her memories of playing games with a Spaldeen as a child.

The games
 Stickball
 Ringolevio
 Stoopball
 Kick the can
 Punchball
 Hopscotch
 Slapball
 Hit the Stick
 Skully
 Double Dutch
 Johnny on a Pony
 Boxball
 Steal the Bacon
 Ace-King-Queen
 Red Rover
 Off the Wall
 Box Baseball

References

External links
 
 

2010 films
2010 documentary films
American documentary films
Documentary films about New York City
Children's games
Street games
2010s English-language films
2010s American films